Norbert P. Arnold, Jr. (November 3, 1920 – December 13, 2014) was an American mechanical engineer, businessman, and politician.

Born in Staples, Minnesota, Arnold served in the United States Navy during World War II. He received his bachelor's degree in mechanical engineering from University of Minnesota. He owned a manufacturing company in Pengilly, Minnesota and had invented the Arnold Ranger V (later renamed Arnold Ferret Tracker), a twin tracked, no ski all season vehicle. From 1967 to 1977, Arnold served in the Minnesota State Senate and was a Democrat. In 1983, Arnold retired and moved to Inver Grove Heights, Minnesota.

Notes

1920 births
2014 deaths
People from Itasca County, Minnesota
People from Staples, Minnesota
University of Minnesota College of Science and Engineering alumni
American mechanical engineers
20th-century American inventors
Businesspeople from Minnesota
Military personnel from Minnesota
Democratic Party Minnesota state senators
People from Inver Grove Heights, Minnesota
20th-century American businesspeople
United States Navy personnel of World War II